William or Bill Towers may refer to:

 William Towers (rugby union) (1861–1904), English-born rugby union forward, capped twice for Wales
 William Towers (priest) (1681–1745), priest and academic, vice-chancellor of the University of Cambridge 
 William Towers (countertenor), English countertenor
 Bill Towers (politician) (1892–1962), Australian politician
 Bill Towers (footballer) (1920–2000), English footballer

See also
William Tower (disambiguation)